Lady Sarah Elizabeth Hay-Williams (née Amherst; 9 July 1801 – 8 August 1876) was an English artist and botanical illustrator. She was born on 9 July 1801 to Sarah Amherst and William Amherst, 1st Earl Amherst. She travelled with her parents to India and while there completed several watercolour paintings now held in the collection of the British Library. She later married Sir John Hay-Williams in 1842. In 1846 Hay-Williams contributed a watercolour to Edwards's Botanical Register. After returning to the United Kingdom she had two children including Margaret Verney. She died in 1876 at Chateau Rhianfa on 8 August 1876.

References

External links

1801 births
1876 deaths
Botanical illustrators
British artists
Wives of baronets
Daughters of British earls